Adolf Bernhard Christoph Hilgenfeld (2 June 182312 January 1907) was a  German Protestant theologian.

Biography
He was born at Stappenbeck near Salzwedel in the Province of Saxony.

He studied at the Friedrich Wilhelm University in Berlin and the University of Halle, and in 1890 became professor ordinarius of theology at the University of Jena. He belonged to the Tübingen school. Fond of emphasizing his independence of Ferdinand Christian Baur, he still, in all important points, followed in the footsteps of his master; his method, which he is wont to contrast as Literarkritik with Baur's Tendenzkritik, "is nevertheless essentially the same as Baur's."

On the whole, however, he modified the positions of the founder of the Tübingen school, going beyond him only in his investigations into the Fourth Gospel. In 1858 he became editor of the Zeitschrift für wissenschaftliche Theologie. Hilgenfeld died in Jena in 1907, aged 83.

Selected works

References

1823 births
1907 deaths
People from the Province of Saxony
German Lutheran theologians
German biblical scholars
New Testament scholars
19th-century German Protestant theologians
19th-century German male writers
German male non-fiction writers
Lutheran biblical scholars
19th-century Lutherans